Cerithiopsis albovittata is a species of very small sea snail, a marine gastropod mollusk in the family Cerithiopsidae.  It was described by Charles Baker Adams in 1850.

Description 
The maximum recorded shell length is 4 mm.

Distribution
This species is known from the Caribbean Sea, the Gulf of Mexico and the Lesser Antilles.

Habitat 
Minimum recorded depth is 11 m. Maximum recorded depth is 11 m.

References

 Rosenberg, G., F. Moretzsohn, and E. F. García. 2009. Gastropoda (Mollusca) of the Gulf of Mexico, Pp. 579–699 in Felder, D.L. and D.K. Camp (eds.), Gulf of Mexico–Origins, Waters, and Biota. Biodiversity. Texas A&M Press, College Station, Texas
 Cecalupo A. & Robba E. (2010) The identity of Murex tubercularis Montagu, 1803 and description of one new genus and two new species of the Cerithiopsidae (Gastropoda: Triphoroidea). Bollettino Malacologico 46: 45-64.

albovittata
Gastropods described in 1850